is a small plains located near Kirishima, Kagoshima Prefecture, Japan. In Shinto, it is the theorized to be the exact place of the descent from Heaven (Takamagahara), known as Tenson kōrin, of Ninigi-no-Mikoto, the grandson of Amaterasu.

Site
In November, usually on the 10th, the  takes place there. It is part of the cultural area surrounding Kirishima-Jingū, a national significant cultural property, mainly because it was the previous site of a shrine that was destroyed by a volcanic eruption from Mount Kirishima (specifically the Takachihonomine volcano peak).

There used to be a previous shrine compound of Kirishima-Jingū called  located there.

A panorama can be seen from the top (~970 metres), including nearby wildlife and Japanese azaleas, a group of Rhododendron.

References

Plains of Japan
Shinto shrines in Kagoshima Prefecture